Beatty Lake may refer to:

 Beatty Lake (Minnesota), a lake in Minnesota
 Beatty Lake (Saskatchewan), a lake in Saskatchewan

See also 
 Beatty (disambiguation)